The Taiwanese American Foundation is an organization working in the Taiwanese immigrant community of the United States. Kenjohn Wang served as founding chairman.

Its main activity is a week-long summer camp for elementary schoolers through adults in the last week of July to the first week of August at a college campus (now a university), in the Midwest called Manchester College.  It has five major programs for each of the age groups: Elementary School, Middle School, High School, and College (the groups are named Junior, Junior High, Youth, and TAFLabs or a counselor respectively).  Each year, there is a theme that is cycled every four years, in this order: Leadership, Identity, Ethics and Values, and Communication. 

In each program, there are small groups. The number of people in each small group depends on how many people attend that program. Also, there is family group time. A Family Group is a Junior or Junior High small group that is linked with a Youth or the College program (the college group usually has only 5-7 people each year, so they make up a small group). Each year the kids in the Juniors and Junior High programs have "Big Sibs" from the Youth and College programs. Your big sib is in your family group. There are about 6 or 7 big sibs per family group. They usually spend time together and there are also special activities to do with your big sib. On the Wednesday of the week, they have a special water balloon fight with all the TAF campers and counselors.

The term "Taiwanese American Foundation" is used by multiple organizations; this one seems to be registered under that name.

See also 
 Taiwanese American Foundation of San Diego

References

External links
 TAF website
 
 

Taiwanese-American culture in California
Organizations established in 1982
1982 establishments in California
Cultural organizations based in California
Youth organizations based in California